Pandu block is one of the administrative blocks of Palamu district, Jharkhand state, India. According to census (2001), the block has a population of 74,464. The block has 71 villages. It is named for Pandu.

Now one more Block, Untari Road has been created from Pandu Block.

There is one Government Hospital, and many Registered Pvt Clinics.

One Branch of Vananchal Gramin bank is taking care of financial needs for the People of this reason.

There exists following facilities in Block Headquarter Pandu:
 BSNL Telephone exchange (Burnt by Maoists several years ago)
 Post Office
 Police Station
 Kalyan High School(Govt)
 Kasturba Gandhi Girls High School (Govt Residential)
 Priyadarshini Indira Gandhi Girls High School (Govt. Aided)
 Government Middle School
 Girls Middle School(Govt.)
 Gyan Jyoti Public School
 SS Public School
 Gyan Niketan Public School
 Saraswati Shishu Mandir(school)
 One PYKKA center is functiong under able leadership of Ktidashree Sanjay Pandey

Pandu is well connected throu Bus from Garhwa, Daltonganj and Rehla.

Nearest Railway station is Untari Road - 12 km, Garwa Road - 15 km, Garhwa - 22 km, DaltonGanj 30 km (Ariel distance)

Nearest Airport is - Ranchi - 180 km, Patna - 187 km, Varanasi- 150 km

See also
 Palamu Loksabha constituency
 Jharkhand Legislative Assembly
 Jharkhand
 Palamu

External links
 Pandu Map
 Pandu Official page
 Jharkhand Vishwanath Temple

Community development blocks in Jharkhand
Community development blocks in Palamu district